Church on the Hill may refer to:

Church on the Hill (Cluj-Napoca)
Church on the Hill (Lenox, Massachusetts)
Church on the Hill (Sighișoara)